Derafshifar Stadium (Persian: ورزشگاه درفشی فر) is the training ground and Academy base of Iranian football club Persepolis. It is located in the Jannatabad neighborhood of Tehran. 

Inside the complex, there are training areas, hotel and pools. There are also a sauna, steam and weight rooms, a restaurant, conference rooms and offices.

External links 
 Derafshifar's Photo

Stadium
Sports venues in Tehran
Football venues in Iran
Association football training grounds in Iran